Bo'ness Academy (BA) is a mixed secondary school in Bo'ness, Falkirk, Scotland.

References 

Secondary schools in Falkirk (council area)